Ministry of Foreign Affairs and Cooperation may refer to:
Ministry of Foreign Affairs and Cooperation (East Timor)
Ministry of Foreign Affairs and International Cooperation (Morocco)